Qinglonghu Town is a town located in northeastern Fangshan District, Beijing, China. It shares border with Tanzhesi Town in the north, Wangzuo Town and Xilu Subdistrict in the east, Yancun Town, Xinzhen and Chengguan Subdistricts in the south, Dongfeng Subdistrict and Hebei Town in the west. Its population was 52,319 as of 2020. 

The town was named after Qinglong Lake that is located within it.

History

Administrative Divisions 

At the end of 2021, Qinglonghu Town had 35 subdivisions, consisted of 3 communities and 32 villages:

Gallery

See also 
 List of township-level divisions of Beijing

References 

Fangshan District
Towns in Beijing